Teesside High School is a co-educational private day-school in Eaglescliffe, Stockton-on-Tees, England.

Introduction 

Teesside High School is a co-educational independent day school in Eaglescliffe, Stockton-on-Tees, in northeast England. It is judged to be ‘Outstanding’ by the Independent Schools Inspectorate.

The school enrolls boys and girls from 3-18 across four school departments; Early Years and Pre-Prep, Prep School, Senior School, and Sixth Form. All departments are based on one school site.

History 

The grounds which Teesside High School occupies were originally home to The Cleveland School, which was founded in 1938 and housed in Woodside Hall on the banks of the River Tees from 1945.

In 1970, The Cleveland School merged with Queen Victoria High School (est. 1883), originally of Yarm Lane, Stockton, to form Teesside High School.

Diamond School 
A system of education evolved towards the end of the twentieth century to address gender differences in education, where girls and boys aren't segregated, called the 'Diamond Model'. This was outlined in the Daily Telegraph Guide to Independent Schools and the Service Parents' Guide. Teesside High School adopted this model in 2005.

Boys and girls were taught separately for core subjects from Year 5 through to the completion of GCSE at 16. Boys and girls mixed socially, both in terms of organised activities and unstructured time during breaks in the school day. In 2015, the school moved away from the Diamond Model to become fully co-educational.

Notable former pupils 

 Shiulie Ghosh, TV presenter
 Hazel Hall (information scientist), Professor of Social Informatics
 Heather Ingman, Professor of English, novelist and journalist
 Charlotte Riley, actress
 Amelia Lily, a contestant in series 8 of the X Factor
 Dr Lara Menzies, Neurologist

References

External links
School Website
Profile on the ISC website
ISI Inspection Reports

Private schools in the Borough of Stockton-on-Tees
Girls' schools in County Durham
Educational institutions established in 1883
1883 establishments in England
Member schools of the Girls' Schools Association
Diamond schools